Skin was a British television documentary programme, aimed at a British African-Caribbean and British Asian audience, between 1980 and 1982. The half-hour programme was produced by London Weekend Television (LWT), and aired weekly on LWT in a Sunday lunchtime slot.

Skin was the first production of LWT's London Minorities Unit (LMU). It introduced the current affairs magazine format later continued by programmes like Black on Black (1982), Ebony (1982), Bandung File and Black Bag (1991).

References

External links
 

1980 British television series debuts
1982 British television series endings
Afro-Caribbean culture in the United Kingdom
Asian-British culture